John de Aston may refer to:

 John de Aston of Parkhall and Heywood (fl. 1475), sheriff of Staffordshire in the reign of Edward IV of England.
 John de Aston (knight banneret) (died 1523), military character during the reigns of Henry VII and Henry VIII

See also 
 John Aston (disambiguation)